Carpathian Romani, also known as Central Romani or Romungro Romani, is a group of dialects of the Romani language spoken from southern Poland to Hungary, and from eastern Austria to Ukraine.

North Central Romani is one of a dozen major dialect groups within Romani, an Indo-Aryan language of Europe. The North Central dialects of Romani are traditionally spoken by some subethnic groups of the Romani people in Hungary, the Czech Republic, Slovakia (with the exception of its southwestern and south-central regions), southeastern Poland, the Transcarpathia province of Ukraine, and parts of Romanian Transylvania. There are also established outmigrant communities of North Central Romani speakers in the United States, and recent outmigrant communities in the United Kingdom, Ireland, Belgium, and some other Western European countries.

Dialects
Elšík uses this classification and dialect examples (geographical information from Matras):

See also
 Languages of Poland
 Languages of Hungary
 Languages of Austria
 Languages of Ukraine

References

Bibliography

 Boretzky, Norbert. 1999. Die Gliederung der Zentralen Dialekte und die Beziehungen zwischen Südlichen Zentralen Dialekten (Romungro) und Südbalkanischen Romani-Dialekten. In: Halwachs, Dieter W. and Florian Menz (eds.) Die Sprache der Roma. Perspektiven der Romani-Forschung in Österreich im interdisziplinären und internazionalen Kontext. Klagenfurt: Drava. 210–276.
 Elšík, Viktor, Milena Hübschmannová, and Hana Šebková. 1999. The Southern Central (ahi-imperfect) Romani dialects of Slovakia and northern Hungary. In: Halwachs, Dieter W. and Florian Menz (eds.) Die Sprache der Roma. Perspektiven der Romani-Forschung in Österreich im interdisziplinären und internazionalen Kontext. Klagenfurt: Drava. 277–390.
 Elšík, Viktor. 2003. Interdialect contact of Czech (and Slovak) Romani varieties. International Journal of the Sociology of Language, 162, 41–62.
 Elšík, Viktor, and Yaron Matras. 2006. Markedness and language change: The Romani sample. Berlin: Mouton de Gruyter.
 

Romani in the Czech Republic
Romani in Hungary
Romani in Poland
Romani in Romania
Romani in Slovakia
Romani in Ukraine
Northern Romani dialects
Languages of the Czech Republic
Languages of Hungary
Languages of Poland
Languages of Romania
Languages of Slovakia
Languages of Ukraine
Languages of the United States